Ronald Charles Gathe Jr. (born 1974) is an American lawyer serving as the United States attorney for the Middle District of Louisiana.

Education

Gathe received a Bachelor of Science degree from Xavier University of Louisiana in 1996 and a Juris Doctor from Southern University Law Center in 2000.

Career

Gathe began his legal career as a law clerk for Judge James Best of the 18th Judicial District Court in Louisiana from 2000 to 2001. From 2001 to 2021, he was in private practice at his own law firm. From 2001 to 2021, he served as an assistant district attorney in the 19th Judicial District Attorney's Office in Louisiana, where he served as section chief from 2009 to 2021. In January 2021, he became chief of trials for the 18th Judicial District Attorney's Office in Louisiana. He served as the vice president of membership for the National Black Prosecutors Association.

U.S. attorney for the Middle District of Louisiana 

On November 12, 2021, President Joe Biden announced his intent to nominate Gathe to be the United States attorney for the Middle District of Louisiana. On November 15, 2021, his nomination was sent to the United States Senate. On December 2, 2021, his nomination was reported out of committee by a voice vote. On December 7, 2021, his nomination was confirmed in the United States Senate by voice vote. He was sworn into office on December 13, 2021.

References

External links
 Biography at U.S. Department of Justice

1974 births
Living people
20th-century American lawyers
21st-century American lawyers
African-American lawyers
District attorneys in Louisiana
Louisiana lawyers
People from New Roads, Louisiana
Southern University Law Center alumni
United States Attorneys for the Middle District of Louisiana
Xavier University of Louisiana alumni